Marathon mountain bike races, often referred to as cross-country marathon (XCM), are a very demanding form of mountain bike racing covering at least  usually in mountainous terrain. Events held in Europe are typically just a little longer than the average cross country mountain bike race.

UCI events

The UCI has established a championship series for such events, the Marathon World Cup. Almost all of the participants are elite professional mountain bike racers. There is an annual world championship event, the UCI Mountain Bike Marathon World Championships. The races can be run over as a single or multi-lap course, however, the course cannot cover the same lap more than three times.

Non-UCI events
Non-UCI events routinely cover much longer distances.  The typical event in the USA is either based on time, typically 12 or 24 hours, or distance, the most common being . Events based on hours typically allow either people to compete individually or as part of the team.  Distance events are almost all solo events. The number of these events and those taking part in them have grown greatly. The first such events began to be held routinely in the early 1990s typically had less than 50 racers. In 2006 nearly 100 events were held and most had more than 150 racers.

The world's largest mountain bike marathon race by the number of participants is the Birkebeinerrittet, held annually in Norway. While the distance is short for a marathon mountain bike event, the number of participants and history make it noteworthy.

Notable races 
 Montezuma’s Revenge
 Wilderness 101 Mountain Bicycle Race
 Mohican MTB 100
 Lumberjack 100
 The Endurance 100
 Breckenridge 100
 Leadville Trail 100 MTB
 Brazil Ride more than 500 km over 7 days
 Chupacabras (cycling race)
 Birkebeinerrittet
 Shenandoah Mountain 100
 Oakridge Mountain Bike Marathon, 55 miles
 La Ruta de los Conquistadores, 161 miles, 3 stages
 Yak Attack
 Cape Epic – 700 km over 8 days
 Titan Desert – 600 km over 6 days

References

External links
 UCI 2015 Mountain Bike Marathon Info
 The National Endurance Mountain Bike Series (NEU MTB Series)

Endurance games
Mountain biking
Ultra-distance cycling